The Island Bridge is a bridge that crosses the Daugava river in Riga, the capital of Latvia. The bridge was built in the period from 1975 to 1977. It was called the Moscow Bridge (Maskavas tilts) until 1991. The bridge provides access to Zaķusala (Hare Island) and Lucavsala.

On June 26, 2018, second phase of the bridge's reconstruction costing 19.6 million euros was initiated.

Gallery

References 

Bridges in Latvia
Bridges in Riga
Crossings of the Daugava River